Kuopio University Hospital (KUH;) is a teaching hospital of the University of Eastern Finland along Puijonlaaksontie at the Puijonlaakso district in Kuopio, Finland. It serves as one of the main hospitals in the country and operates in the facilities of Central Hospital of Puijo (Puijon keskussairaala), Children's Hospital of Alava (Alavan lastensairaala) and Psychiatric Hospital of Julkula (Julkulan psykiatrinen sairaala) in Kuopio, and also former Tarina Hospital (Tarinan sairaala) in Siilinjärvi.

After Kuopio, the municipalities of Siilinjärvi, Varkaus and Iisalmi use the services of the hospital district the most. KYS is Kuopio's second largest employer after the city of Kuopio; in 2011, Kuopio University Hospital employed a total of 4,113 people. KYS is also Finland's largest medical educator in terms of enrollment.

KYS has an Epilepsy Center (Epilepsiakeskus) that provides diagnostics and treatment for severe epilepsy in both adults and children. The unit's special expertise is intracranial brain curve recordings and epilepsy surgery, which are nationwide concentrated in Kuopio and Helsinki, but most of Finland's epilepsy surgical procedures are performed in Kuopio. With regard to other areas of expertise in KYS, the Heart Center (Sydänkeskus) is a worldwide pioneer in the development of biological bypass surgery and gene therapy for heart failure.

See also 
 North Karelia Central Hospital

References

External links 

 Kuopio University Hospital (KYS) - Official Site
 Kuopio University Hospital at European Investment Bank
 Investor News: Caverion to electrify new building of Kuopio University Hospital in Finland at Caverion

Hospitals established in 1959
1959 establishments in Finland
Buildings and structures in Kuopio
University of Eastern Finland
Hospitals in Finland
Teaching hospitals